Potato virus A (PVA) is a plant pathogenic virus of the family Potyviridae.

See also 

 Viral diseases of potato

External links
ICTVdB - The Universal Virus Database: Potato virus A
Family Groups - The Baltimore Method

Viral plant pathogens and diseases
Potyviruses